The 2018–19 Botswana Premier League is the 54th season of the Botswana Premier League, the top-tier football league in Botswana, since its establishment in 1966. The season started on 18 August 2018. The league drew an average attendance of 1,300 per match.

Teams

Promotion and Relegation
Two teams were relegated after one year in the Botswana Premier League, TAFIC F.C. and Uniao Flamengo Santos. They were joined by last place finishers Gilport Lions.

They were replaced by First Division North winners BR Highlanders, First Division South winners Notwane F.C., and promotion playoff winners Prisons XI.

Summary
Township Rollers won their fourth consecutive Botswana Premier League after a 0–0 draw with Police XI on 27 May 2019.

This season also featured the relegation of four time champions Mochudi Centre Chiefs, who only picked up five points from nine matches late in the season.

League table

References

Botswana Premier League
Botswana
2018 in Botswana sport
2019 in Botswana sport